Gordan is a Slavic name derived Proto-Slavic *gъrdъ (gȏrd) meaning proud:

Given name

 Gordan Golik, Croatian football midfielder  
 Gordan Giriček, Croatian basketball player
 Gordan Jandroković, Croatian diplomat and politician
 Gordan Kičić, Serbian actor, comedian and director
 Gordan Nikolitch, Serbian violinist
 Gordan Petrić, Serbian footballer
 Gordan Vidović, Belgian footballer

Surname
Paul Gordan, German mathematician
Shahab Gordan, Iranian footballer

See also 
 Gordana
 Goran

Serbian masculine given names
Croatian masculine given names
Slovene masculine given names
Macedonian masculine given names
Bulgarian masculine given names